Dr. W. R. and Eunice Taylor House  is a mansion located in Forest Grove, Oregon. It was listed on the National Register of Historic Places in 2005.

History 
The house was built in 1921 by John Taylor as per the Dutch Colonial Revival-style dwelling. It was remodelled two times, first time in 1982, then the last one was in the year 1995.

References

National Register of Historic Places in Washington County, Oregon
Houses in Washington County, Oregon
Houses on the National Register of Historic Places in Oregon
Houses completed in 1921